Hasina Miya is a Nepalese politician, who is the member of Communist Party of Nepal (Unified Marxist-Leninist). Following the 2008 Constituent Assembly election, she was selected by CPN (UML) from the Proportional Representation quota to represent the party in the assembly. Earlier, Miya ran a bangle shop in Dulegauda, Tanahu District.

References

Nepalese Muslims
Living people
Communist Party of Nepal (Unified Marxist–Leninist) politicians
21st-century Nepalese women politicians
21st-century Nepalese politicians
Year of birth missing (living people)
Members of the 1st Nepalese Constituent Assembly